DE261 may refer to:
 Delaware Route 261